Most of the works of Rogier van der Weyden consist of  triptychs, diptychs or polyptychs, each including more than one panel. Some are dismembered and the parts are kept in different museums. Some panels are only fragmentary remains.

This list features the paintings accepted as authentic by Dirk de Vos (2000). They are listed chronologically following the datings of de Vos. All works are executed in oil on oak panels unless otherwise mentioned.

Works
c. 1425–1430
 Enthroned Virgin and Child in a Niche, Madrid, Museo Thyssen-Bornemisza; and Saint George and the Dragon, National Gallery of Art, Washington. Both ca. 14 × 10 cm.
 Crucifixion, Berlin, Gemäldegalerie, Berlin, inv. nr. 538 A., 79 × 49 cm.

c. 1430–1432
 Diptych with the Virgin and Child Standing in a Niche, and Saint Catherine in a landscape, Vienna, Kunsthistorisches Museum, inv. nr. 951 and 955. Both ca. 19 × 12 cm.

c. 1430–1435
 Descent from the Cross, Madrid, Museo del Prado, inv. nr. 2825. 220 × 259 cm.
 Virgin and Child in a Niche, the so-called Durán Madonna, Madrid, Museo del Prado, inv. nr. 2722. 100 × 52 cm.
 Portrait of a Woman (sometimes considered as the portrait of van der Weyden's wife Elisabeth Goffaert), Gemäldegalerie, Berlin, inv. nr. 545 D. 47 × 32 cm.
 Annunciation Triptych. Center panel, with the Annunciation in Paris, Musée du Louvre, inv. nr. 1982. 87 × 91 cm; wings with the Visitation and a Clergyman Kneeled in Prayer in Turin, Galleria Sabauda, inv. nr. 210 and 320. Both 89 × 36,5 cm.

c. 1435–1440
 Saint Luke Drawing the Virgin, Boston Museum of Fine Arts, Higginson bequest, 93.153. 138 × 111 cm.
 Visitation (van der Weyden), Leipzig, Museum der bildenden Künste, inv. nr. 1550. 58 × 36 cm.
 Triptych with the crucifixion, so called: Abegg Triptych, Riggisberg, Abegg-Stiftung, inv. nr. 14.2.63. Center panel: 103 × 72 cm. Wings, both: 103 × 33 cm.

c. 1440–1445
 Triptych of the Seven Sacraments, so called Chevrot Altarpiece, Antwerp, Koninklijk Museum voor Schone Kunsten Antwerpen, inv. nr. 393-395. center panel: 200 × 97 cm, Both side panels: 119 × 63 cm.
 Triptych of Our Fair Lady, so called Miraflores Altarpiece, Gemäldegalerie, Berlin, inv. nr. 534A.  Three panels: 74 × 45 cm each.
 Triptych with the crucifixion, Vienna, Kunsthistorisches Museum, inv. nr. 901. Center panel: 96 × 69 cm. Wings: 101 × 35 cm.
 The Magdalen Reading, Saint Catherine and Saint Joseph, fragments of a lost Sacra Conversazione, Mary Magdalen in: National Gallery, London inv. nr. 645. 62 × 54 cm.; Heads of Saint Catherine and Saint Joseph in Lisbon, Calouste Gulbenkian Foundation, inv. nr. 75B and 79 A. Both fragments ca. 21 × 18 cm.

c. 1445–1450
 Triptych with the Birth of Christ, so called Bladelin Triptych, Gemäldegalerie, Berlin, inv. nr. 535. Center panel: 94 × 92 cm, Wings each: 94 × 42 cm.
 Jean Wauquelin presenting his 'Chroniques de Hainaut' to Philip the Good, dedication miniature from the 'Chroniques de Hainaut', Brussels, Royal Library of Belgium, ms. 9242, fol.1,  paint on parchment, 15,4 × 20 cm (illustration), 42,3 × 28,8 (leaf).  Apparently Rogier's only surviving miniature.
 Beaune Altarpiece, so called: Last Judgement, Beaune, Hôtel-Dieu, Beaune, originally oil on oak panels, today some panels are transferred to canvas. The polyptych consists of 15 different parts. The large center part measures 210 × 100 cm, the small upper wings measure 72 × 45 cm. Opened the polyptych measures 210 × 548 cm.

c. 1445–1455
 Saint Margareth and Saint Apollonia, Right wing of a lost triptych, Gemäldegalerie, Berlin, inv. nr. 534C. 51,5 × 27,5 cm.

c. 1450–1455
 The Braque Triptych, Paris, Musée du Louvre, inv. nr. RF 2063. Center panel: 34 × 62 cm, wings each 34 × 27 cm.
 Portrait of a man, Madrid, Museo Thyssen-Bornemisza, inv. nr. 1930.26. 32 × 23 cm.
 Triptych with the Adoration of the Magi, so-called Columba Altarpiece, Munich, Alte Pinakothek, inv. nr. WAF 1189-1191. Center panel: ca. 140 × 153, Wings each: ca. 140 × 73 cm.
 Triptych with scenes from the life of John the Baptist, so called Saint Johns Altarpiece, Gemäldegalerie, Berlin, inv. nr. 534B. Each panel ca. 77 × 48 cm.
 The crucified Christ between the mourning Mary and Saint John, so called Crucifixion of Scheut, El Escorial, inv. nr. 10014602. 325 × 192 cm.

c. 1455–1464
 Pietà, Brussels, Royal Museums of Fine Arts of Belgium, inv. nr. 3515. 33 × 47 cm.

c. 1455–1460
 Diptych of Jean Gros, Left wing: Virgin with Child in Musée des Beaux-Arts Tournai, inv. nr. 481. Right wing: Portrait of Jean Gros, Art Institute of Chicago, Ryerson Collection nr. 1933.1052. Both wings ca. 39 × 29 cm.
 Portrait of Francesco d'Este, New York, Metropolitan Museum of Art, Friedsam Collection, inv. nr. 32.100.43. ca. 30 × 20 cm.

c. 1460
 Diptych of Philippe de Croy, Lord of Sempy, left wing: Virgin and Child in: San Marino (California), The Huntington Library, inv. nr. 26.105.; right wing: Portrait of Philippe de Croy in: Antwerp, Koninklijk Museum voor Schone Kunsten Antwerpen, inv. nr. 254. both wings ca. 49 × 30 cm.
 Portrait of a Woman, National Gallery of Art, Washington, D.C. 34 cm x 25.5 cm

c. 1461–1462
 Portrait of Charles the Bold, Gemäldegalerie, Berlin, inv.nr. 545. 51 × 34 cm.
 Portrait of Antoine, bastard of Burgundy, Brussels, Royal Museums of Fine Arts of Belgium, inv.nr. 1449. 38 × 28 cm.
 Virgin and Child, Houston, Museum of Fine Arts, Edith A. and Percy S. Strauss Collection, inv. nr. 44-535. 32 × 23 cm.

c. 1460–1464
 Virgin and Child with four Saints, the so-called Medici Madonna, painted for the Medici family in Florence, Städel, Frankfurt, inv. nr. 850. 51 × 38 cm.

c. 1463–1464
 Diptych of Jean de Froimont, left wing: Virgin and Child in: Caen, Musée des Beaux-Arts, inv.nr. M.91. right wing: Brussels, Royal Museums of Fine Arts of Belgium, inv.nr. 4279. both wings ca. 51 × 33 cm. (According to a publication by Dominique Vanwijnsberghe).
 Portrait of a Lady, sometimes identified as Marie de Valengin, bastard daughter of Philip III, Duke of Burgundy, Washington D.C., National Gallery of Art, Andrew W. Mellon Collection, inv.nr. 1937.1.44. 37 × 27 cm.
 Entombment of Christ, or Lamentation of Christ, probably commissioned by the  Medici, Florence, Uffizi Gallery, inv.nr. 1114. 96 x 110 cm.
 Calvary diptych, left wing: Mary in grief, supported by Saint John, right wing: Crucifixion, probably the outside of the wings of a lost carved altarpiece, Philadelphia, Philadelphia Museum of Art, The John G. Johnson Collection, inv.nr. 334-335.
  

Copies after Van der Weyden
 A 15th-century copy after the Madrid Descent from the Cross by an anonymous master (the so-called Edelheer-triptych) is preserved in the Sint-Pieterskerk, Leuven, Belgium.

References

Sources
de Vos, Dirk (2000). Rogier van der Weyden: The Complete Works. Harry N Abrams. 

 
Weyden
Weyden
.
Early Netherlandish paintings